The Panasonic Lumix G X Vario 12-35mm f/2.8 is a zoom lens in the Micro Four Thirds system.  It is a "standard zoom"- ranging from moderately wide to moderately tele.  Panasonic's "HD" branding indicates focus and zoom motors are quiet, for videography.  The optics contain Panasonic's "nano surface coating".

External links

References
 Official webpage
 DXOMark's review

12-35
Camera lenses introduced in 2012